Nodong(-)dang or Rodong(-)dang, literally Labor Party (or Workers' Party) may also refer to:

Korea (1945-1948) 
 Socialist Labour Party (Korea) (1946-1947)
 Workers' Party of North Korea (1946-1949)
 Workers' Party of South Korea (1946-1949)

North Korea (1948-) 
 Workers' Party of Korea (1949-)

South Korea (1948-) 
 Democratic Labor Party (South Korea) (2000-2012)
 Labor Party (South Korea) (2013-)

See also 
 Jinbodang (disambiguation)
 Minjudang (disambiguation)